is an archery athlete from Japan, competing in both individual and team archery events. He competed in the 2004, 2008, 2012, and 2020 Summer Olympics.  He is the 2006 All-Japan National Champion,

Archery career
Furukawa began his archery career in 2001.  He competes using a recursive bow.

2004-2006 archery competitions
Furukawa competed at the 2004 Summer Olympics in men's individual archery and archery team evens.  In the individual competition, he won his first match, advancing to the round of 32.  In the second round of elimination, he was defeated. His final rank was 22nd overall. Furukawa was also a member of the 8th-place Japanese men's archery team. 

Furukawa is the 2006 All-Japan National Champion, having won the 2006 All-Japan Archery nationals at Yamaguchi in November 2006.

2008 Summer Olympics
At the 2008 Summer Olympics in Beijing, Furukawa finished his ranking round with a total of 663 points, which gave him the 17th seed for the final competition bracket in which he faced Maksim Kunda in the first round. Despite Kunda only being the 48th seed he managed to equal Furukawa and both archers scored 111 points. In the extra round Furukawa scored 18 points, but Kunda advanced to the next round because he scored 19 points.

2012 Summer Olympics (silver medal) 
At the 2012 Summer Olympics in London, Furukawa finished his ranking round with a 679, good for the 5th seed in the competition bracket. He advanced to the gold medal round, where he faced South Korea's Oh Jin-Hyek. After Oh Jin-Hyek scored seven set points to Furukawa's one, Oh-Jin Hyek was awarded the gold medal and Furukawa was awarded the silver.

2020 Summer Olympics (bronze medals)
Furukawa won bronze medals as a member of the Japanese Men's team and as an individual.

References

External links
 
 
 

1984 births
Living people
Japanese male archers
Archers at the 2004 Summer Olympics
Archers at the 2008 Summer Olympics
Archers at the 2012 Summer Olympics
Archers at the 2016 Summer Olympics
Archers at the 2020 Summer Olympics
Olympic archers of Japan
Olympic silver medalists for Japan
Olympic medalists in archery
Medalists at the 2012 Summer Olympics
Asian Games medalists in archery
Archers at the 2010 Asian Games
Archers at the 2014 Asian Games
Archers at the 2018 Asian Games
Medalists at the 2018 Asian Games
Asian Games gold medalists for Japan
World Archery Championships medalists
People from Aomori (city)
Medalists at the 2020 Summer Olympics
Olympic bronze medalists for Japan
21st-century Japanese people